Picolinic acid is an organic compound with the formula C5H4N(CO2H). It is a derivative of pyridine with a carboxylic acid (COOH) substituent at the 2-position. It is an isomer of nicotinic acid and isonicotinic acid, which have the carboxyl side chain at the 3- and 4-position, respectively. It is a white solid that is soluble in water.

In synthetic organic chemistry, has been used as a substrate in the Mitsunobu reaction and in the Hammick reaction.

Coordination chemistry
Picolinic acid is a bidentate chelating agent of elements such as chromium, zinc, manganese, copper, iron, and molybdenum in the human body. Many of its complexes are charge-neutral and thus lipophilic.  After its role in absorption was discovered, zinc picolinate dietary supplements became popular as they were shown to be an effective means of introducing zinc into the body.

Production
Picolinic acid is formed from 2-methylpyridine by oxidation, e.g. by means of potassium permanganate (KMnO4).

Biosynthesis
Picolinic acid is a catabolite of the amino acid tryptophan through the kynurenine pathway. Its function is unclear, but it has been implicated in a variety of neuroprotective, immunological, and anti-proliferative effects. In addition, it is suggested to assist in the absorption of zinc(II) ions and other divalent or trivalent ions through the small intestine.

Picolinates 
Salts of picolinic acid (picolinates) include:
 Chromium(III) picolinate
 Zinc picolinate

See also 
 Dipicolinic acid

References 

2-Pyridyl compounds
Glycine receptor agonists
Chelating agents
Aromatic acids